In poetry, a hendecasyllable (sometimes hendecasyllabic) is a line of eleven syllables. The term may refer to several different poetic meters, the older of which are quantitative and used chiefly in classical (Ancient Greek and Latin) poetry, and the newer of which are syllabic or accentual-syllabic and used in medieval and modern poetry.

Classical

In classical poetry, "hendecasyllable" or "hendecasyllabic" may refer to any of three distinct 11-syllable Aeolic meters, used first in Ancient Greece and later, with little modification, by Roman poets.

Aeolic meters are characterized by an Aeolic base × × followed by a choriamb – u u –; where –=a long syllable, u=a short syllable, and ×=an anceps, that is, a syllable either long or short. The three Aeolic hendecasyllables (with base and choriamb in bold) are:

Phalaecian:
 × × – u u – u – u – –

This is a line used only occasionally in Greek choral odes and scolia, but a favorite of Catullus who realized the Aeolic base as – – or – × or × –, but not as × ×; for example, in the first poem in his collection (with formal equivalent, substituting English stress for Latin length):

Alcaic:
 × – u – × – u u – u –
Here the Aeolic base is truncated to a single anceps. This meter typically appears as the first two lines of an Alcaic stanza. (For an English example, see §English, below.)

Sapphic:
 – u – × – u u – u – –
Again, the Aeolic base is truncated. This meter typically appears as the first three lines of a Sapphic stanza, though it has served in stichic verse, for example by Seneca and Boethius. Sappho wrote many of the stanzas subsequently named after her, for example (with formal equivalent, substituting English stress for Greek length):

Italian
The hendecasyllable is the principal metre in Italian poetry. Its defining feature is a constant stress on the tenth syllable, so that the number of syllables in the verse may vary, equaling eleven in the usual case where the final word is stressed on the penultimate syllable.  The verse also has a stress preceding the caesura, on either the fourth or sixth syllable. The first case is called endecasillabo a minore, or lesser hendecasyllable, and has the first hemistich equivalent to a quinario; the second is called endecasillabo a maiore, or greater hendecasyllable, and has a settenario as the first hemistich.

There is a strong tendency for hendecasyllabic lines to end with feminine rhymes (causing the total number of syllables to be eleven, hence the name), but ten-syllable lines ("Ciò che 'n grembo a Benaco star non può") and twelve-syllable lines ("Ergasto mio, perché solingo e tacito") are encountered as well. Lines of ten or twelve syllables are more common in rhymed verse; versi sciolti, which rely more heavily on a pleasant rhythm for effect, tend toward a stricter eleven-syllable format. As a novelty, lines longer than twelve syllables can be created by the use of certain verb forms and affixed enclitic pronouns ("Ottima è l'acqua; ma le piante abbeverinosene.").

Additional accents beyond the two mandatory ones provide rhythmic variation and allow the poet to express thematic effects. A line in which accents fall consistently on even-numbered syllables ("Al còr gentìl rempàira sèmpre amóre") is called iambic (giambico) and may be a greater or lesser hendecasyllable. This line is the simplest, commonest and most musical but may become repetitive, especially in longer works. Lesser hendecasyllables often have an accent on the seventh syllable ("fàtta di giòco in figùra d'amóre"). Such a line is called dactylic (dattilico) and its less pronounced rhythm is considered particularly appropriate for representing dialogue. Another kind of greater hendecasyllable has an accent on the third syllable ("Se Mercé fosse amìca a' miei disìri") and is known as anapestic (anapestico). This sort of line has a crescendo effect and gives the poem a sense of speed and fluidity.

It is considered improper for the lesser hendecasyllable to use a word accented on its antepenultimate syllable (parola sdrucciola) for its mid-line stress. A line like "Più non sfavìllano quegli òcchi néri", which delays the caesura until after the sixth syllable, is not considered a valid hendecasyllable.

Most classical Italian poems are composed in hendecasyllables, including the major works of Dante, Francesco Petrarca, Ludovico Ariosto, and Torquato Tasso. The rhyme systems used include terza rima, ottava, sonnet and canzone, and some verse forms use a mixture of hendecasyllables and shorter lines. From the early 16th century onward, hendecasyllables are often used without a strict system, with few or no rhymes, both in poetry and in drama. This is known as verso sciolto. An early example is Le Api ("the bees") by Giovanni di Bernardo Rucellai, written around 1517 and published in 1525 (with formal equivalent paraphrase which mirrors the original's syllabic counts, varied caesurae, and line- and hemistich-final stress profiles):

Like other early Italian-language tragedies, the Sophonisba of Gian Giorgio Trissino (1515) is in blank hendecasyllables. Later examples can be found in the Canti of Giacomo Leopardi, where hendecasyllables are alternated with settenari.

Polish
The hendecasyllabic metre was very popular in Polish poetry, especially in the seventeenth and eighteenth centuries, owing to strong Italian literary influence. It was used by Jan Kochanowski, Piotr Kochanowski (who translated Jerusalem Delivered by Torquato Tasso), Sebastian Grabowiecki, Wespazjan Kochowski and Stanisław Herakliusz Lubomirski. The greatest Polish Romantic poet, Adam Mickiewicz, set his poem Grażyna in this measure. The Polish hendecasyllable is widely used when translating English blank verse.

The eleven-syllable line is normally a line of 5+6 syllables with medial caesura, primary stresses on the fourth and tenth syllables, and feminine endings on both half-lines. Although the form can accommodate a fully iambic line, there is no such tendency in practice, word stresses falling variously on any of the initial syllables of each half-line.
 o o o S s | o o o o S s
 
 o=any syllable, S=stressed syllable, s=unstressed syllable

A popular form of Polish literature that employs the hendecasyllable is the Sapphic stanza: 11/11/11/5. 

The Polish hendecasyllable is often combined with an 8-syllable line: 11a/8b/11a/8b. Such a stanza was used by Mickiewicz in his ballads, as in the following example (with formal equivalent paraphrase):

Portuguese
The hendecasyllable is a common meter in Portuguese poetry. The best-known Portuguese poem composed in hendecasyllables is Luís de Camões' Lusiads, which begins as follows:

In Portuguese, the hendecasyllable meter is often called "decasyllable" (decassílabo), even when the work in question uses overwhelmingly feminine rhymes (as is the case with the Lusiads). This is due to Portuguese prosody considering verses to end at the last stressed syllable, thus the aforementioned verses are effectively decasyllabic according to Portuguese scansion.

Spanish
The hendecasyllable is less pervasive in Spanish poetry than in Italian or Portuguese, but it is commonly used with Italianate verse forms like sonnets and ottava rima (as found, for example, in Alonso de Ercilla's epic La Araucana).

Spanish dramatists often use hendecasyllables in tandem with shorter lines like heptasyllables, as can be seen in Rosaura's opening speech from Calderón's La vida es sueño:

English
The term "hendecasyllable" most often refers to an imitation of Greek or Latin metrical lines, notably by Alfred Tennyson, Swinburne, and Robert Frost ("For Once Then Something"). Contemporary American poets Annie Finch ("Lucid Waking") and Patricia Smith ("The Reemergence of the Noose") have published recent examples.  In English, which lacks phonemic length, poets typically substitute stressed syllables for long, and unstressed syllables for short. Tennyson, however, attempted to maintain the quantitative features of the meter (while supporting them with concurrent stress) in his Alcaic stanzas, the first two lines of which are Alcaic hendecasyllables:

Occasionally "hendecasyllable" is used to denote a line of iambic pentameter with a feminine ending, as in the first line of John Keats's Endymion: "A thing of beauty is a joy for ever".

See also 
 Hexasyllable
 Octosyllable
 Decasyllable
 Dodecasyllable

References

Further reading

Italian texts
Raffaele Spongano, Nozioni ed esempi di metrica italiana, Bologna, R. Pàtron, 1966
Angelo Marchese, Dizionario di retorica e di stilistica, Milano, Mondadori, 1978
Mario Pazzaglia, Manuale di metrica italiana, Firenze, Sansoni, 1990

Polish texts
 Wiktor Jarosław Darasz, Mały przewodnik po wierszu polskim, Kraków 2003.

Types of verses
Sonnet studies

la:Hendecasyllabi